Semra Yetiş (born October 1, 1987) is a Turkish road cyclist and mountain biker.

She competed between 2007 and 2009 for the first Turkish UCI mountain biking team Goldcity Alanya. Following the dissolution of the team in early 2009, she went to Germany to ride on Koga Miyata Team for one season. Returned home, she signed for MKE Ankaragücü racing in 2010. In 2011, Yetiş was with Istanbulspor and in 2012 with Brisaspor, Kocaeli. From the 2013 season, she competed for Ankara Gençlik Hizmetleri SK.

Semra Yetiş became the first ever Turkish female cyclist qualifying for participation at the 2009 UCI Road World Championships – Women's road race held in Mendrisio, Switzerland.

Major results
Sources:

Mountain biking

2006
 1st  Cross-country marathon, National Mountain Bike Championships
2007
 2nd Cross-country, National Mountain Bike Championships
 2nd Gaziantep Mountainbike, Gaziantep
 2nd Polonez Adampol Cup, Istanbul
 2nd Cross-country, Kartepe Cup, Kocaeli
 2nd Cross-country, İzmir Cup, İzmir
 2nd Cross-country, Yalova Aksa Cup, Yalova
 3rd Ankara MTB Cup, Ankara
2008
 1st  Cross-country, Balkan Mountain Bike Championships
 1st  Cross-country, National Mountain Bike Championships
 1st Gaziantep Mountainbike
 1st Gaziantep Mountainbike (b)
 2nd Alaçatı-İzmir Mountainbike
 2nd Tuzla, Mountainbike
 3rd Finike/Antalya Mountainbike
 3rd Goreme/Nevsehir Mountainbike
2010
 1st Adana MTB Cup
 2nd Cross-country, National Mountain Bike Championships
2011
 2nd Cross-country, National Mountain Bike Championships
2012
 1st  Cross-country, National Mountain Bike Championships
2013
 2nd Cross-country, National Mountain Bike Championships
2014
 2nd Cross-country, National Mountain Bike Championships
2015
 2nd Cross-country, National Mountain Bike Championships
2016
 2nd Cross-country, National Mountain Bike Championships
2017
 3rd Cross-country, National Mountain Bike Championships
2021
 2nd Cross-country, National Mountain Bike Championships
2022
 National Mountain Bike Championships
2nd Cross-country
2nd Cross-country eliminator

Road

2008
 National Road Championships
1st  Road race
2nd Time trial
2009
 3rd Time trial, National Road Championships
2012
 National Road Championships
1st  Road race
2nd Time trial
2013
 1st  Time trial, National Road Championships
2014
 National Road Championships
1st  Road race
1st  Time trial
2015
 National Road Championships
2nd Road race
3rd Time trial

See also
 Turkish women in sports

References

External links

1987 births
Place of birth missing (living people)
Living people
Turkish female cyclists
Turkish mountain bikers
Marathon mountain bikers